Archizoom is an architecture museum settled on the campus of the École polytechnique fédérale de Lausanne, in Lausanne, Switzerland. It provides a public programme of exhibitions, lectures and events for the ENAC Faculty.

History 
This programme was created in 1974 by Edith Bianchi, a graphic designer who wished to both complement education at the school of architecture and communicate about architecture to a general audience.

In 2007, with impetus from architect Harry Gugger, then associate of the firm Herzog & de Meuron and professor at the EPFL, the scope of the gallery was broadened and it was renamed Archizoom.

Mission 
Under the leadership of the new director and art historian Cyril Veillon, the Archizoom gallery focuses on the interdisciplinary aspects of the architecture and highlights its close relationship with art, science, engineering and the humanities. Borrowing architecture critic Paul Goldberger’s words, Archizoom’s programme addresses the question of ‘why architecture matters’.

Exhibitions 

Archizoom produces around 4-6 temporary exhibitions per year about international and regional architecture. Archives of all exhibitions since 1974 can be consulted on Archizoom website.

Lectures 

Archizoom hosts around 12-15 events (lectures, symposium, exhibition openings, guided visits, workshops for kids) per year related to the exhibitions and on the cultural dimension of the built environment. The lectures are usually recorded and broadcast on Archizoom YouTube channel.

See also 
 Lausanne campus

References

External links 
 Official website
 ENAC Faculty Website
 Museums in Lausanne

Museums in Lausanne
Architecture museums
Tourist attractions in Lausanne